Paul-Tijs (Tijs) Goldschmidt (born 30 January 1953 in Amsterdam) is a Dutch writer and evolutionary biologist. Since 1 March 2012, Goldschmidt is writer in residence of the Artis Bibliotheek, which is part of the University of Amsterdam (UvA).

Goldschmidt lived in Tanzania from 1981 to 1986, where he studied cichlids in Lake Victoria as a researcher from Leiden University. He wrote a dissertation on this and published a book called Darwin's Dreampond: Drama on Lake Victoria
(original Dutch title: Darwins hofvijver) in which he intertwines scientific and personal experiences. This book has been translated into, amongst other languages, English, French, German, and Japanese.

Since 2009, Tijs Goldschmidt is advisor at the Rijksakademie van beeldende kunsten in Amsterdam.

References

1953 births
Living people
Dutch biologists
Dutch non-fiction writers
Evolutionary biologists
Writers from Amsterdam
Leiden University alumni